Bill Park (born 1952), is a Canadian swimming coach and former international swimmer. Since his competitive career in the 1960s and 1970s, Park has coached several Olympic, and Paralympic athletes including, Alex Baumann, Jessica Tuomela, Jenna Skieneh, and several other world-renowned athletes.

Par, has taken Olympic and Paralympic athletes since the 1984 Summer Olympics, in Los Angeles. Bill also coached for the Greater Trail Swim Club in Trail, British Columbia.

References

1952 births
Canadian male swimmers
Swimmers at the 1967 Pan American Games
Swimmers at the 1971 Pan American Games
Canadian swimming coaches
Swimmers from Toronto
Living people
Pan American Games competitors for Canada